"Found That Soul" is a single by the Manic Street Preachers, released on 26 February 2001 from the Know Your Enemy album.  Writing credit was shared by all three members of the band, James Dean Bradfield, Sean Moore and Nicky Wire. The song reached number 9 in the UK Singles Chart.

Launch

Launched on the same day as "So Why So Sad", this was the first release by the Manics since the number-one hit "The Masses Against the Classes" thirteen months earlier. It reached a UK chart position of number 9 on 10 March 2001, in the same week that "So Why So Sad" reached number 8. Less than 200 copies separated "Found That Soul" from "So Why So Sad" placing it 1 place lower at number 9. Despite making the top ten it wasn't included on the band's greatest hits album, Forever Delayed, making it the band's only top ten single at the time of the compilation's release not to appear.

The CD also included versions of "Locust Valley" and "Ballad of the Bangkok Novotel," whereas the 7" included a live version of "The Masses Against the Classes". "Ballad of the Bangkok Novotel" is entirely sung by Nicky Wire. In Benjamin Millar's review of Know Your Enemy for The Blurb, he described "Found That Soul" which "gets us off to a manic and electric start, a sonic attack that makes a huge noise for a three-piece."

Track listing
All tracks written and composed by Nick Jones, James Dean Bradfield and Sean Moore.

CD (UK)
 "Found That Soul" – 3:05
 "Locust Valley" – 4:09
 "Ballad of the Bangkok Novotel" – 2:36

CD (AUS)
 "Found That Soul" – 3:05
 "So Why So Sad" – 3:55
 "Locust Valley" – 4:09
 "Ballad of the Bangkok Novotel" – 2:36

7"
 "Found That Soul" – 3:05
 "The Masses Against the Classes" (live at Millennium Stadium, 31 December 1999) – 3:00

Charts

References

2001 singles
Manic Street Preachers songs
Songs written by James Dean Bradfield
Songs written by Sean Moore (musician)
Songs written by Nicky Wire
Song recordings produced by Dave Eringa
2000 songs
Epic Records singles